Lan County or Lanxian is a county under the administration of Lüliang City, in west-central Shanxi province, China.

History
Lanxian was formerly the seat of Lan Prefecture, during which time it was known as Lanzhou.

Climate

References

External links
www.xzqh.org 

County-level divisions of Shanxi